Winstanley is a 1975 British black-and-white film about social reformer and writer Gerrard Winstanley. It was made by Kevin Brownlow and Andrew Mollo (creators of It Happened Here) and based on the 1961 David Caute novel Comrade Jacob.

Plot
The film details the story of the 17th-century social reformer and writer Gerrard Winstanley, who, along with a small band of followers known as the Diggers, tried to establish a self-sufficient farming community on common land at St George's Hill ("Diggers' Hill") near Cobham, Surrey. The community was one of the world's first small-scale experiments in socialism or communism, and its ideas were copied elsewhere in England during the time of the Protectorate of Oliver Cromwell, but it was quickly suppressed, and in the end left only a legacy of ideas to inspire later generations of socialist theorists.

Cast

 Miles Halliwell – Gerrard Winstanley
 Terry Higgins – Tom Haydon
 Jerome Willis – Lord General Fairfax
 Phil Oliver – Will Everard
 David Bramley – Parson Platt
 Alison Halliwell – Mrs. Platt
 Dawson France – Captain Gladman
 Bill Petch – Henry Bickerstaffe
 Barry Shaw – Colonel Rich
 Sid Rawle – Ranter
 George Hawkins – John Coulton
 Stanley Reed – Recorder
 Philip Stearns – Francis Drake
 Flora Skrine – Mrs. Drake

Filming
Great efforts were made to produce a film of high historical accuracy. Armour used was real armour from the 1640s, borrowed from the Tower of London. Real-life activist Sid Rawle played a Ranter (i.e. a member of one or other of several English Revolution-period anarchist-type groups).

The film was reissued on DVD and Blu-ray in 2009 by the British Film Institute (BFI), which had funded the original project.

References

External links

Dennis Schwartz review of 'Winstanley'
Book 'Winstanley: Warts and All' by Kevin Brownlow (about the making of the film)

1975 films
1975 drama films
Films based on British novels
English Civil War films
British drama films
Films directed by Kevin Brownlow
1970s English-language films
1970s British films
Squatting in film